Angel III: The Final Chapter is a 1988 American action thriller film written and directed by Tom DeSimone. It is the third installment in the Angel film series, and stars Mitzi Kapture in the role of Molly, a former prostitute.

Plot
Molly, now a freelance photographer (having apparently abandoned law school) living in New York City, is at an art show and accidentally takes a picture of a woman who turns out to be her mother, who abandoned her over 14 years ago. Molly learns she has a sister and both are connected to a dangerous crime element. Molly goes to Los Angeles to find out if the woman is her mother. The reunion is short-lived when her mother calls her to tell her that her sister is in danger and later, her mother is killed in an explosion. Molly must once again become Angel to try and find her sister.

Cast
 Mitzi Kapture as Molly Stewart/Angel
 Maud Adams as Nadine
 Richard Roundtree as Lt. Doniger
 Mark Blankfield as Spanky
Emile Beaucard as Shahid
 Kin Shriner as Neal
 Tawny Fere as Michelle
S.A. Griffin as Roger
Floyd Levine as Lt. Mellin
Dick Miller as Nick Pellegrini
Toni Basil as Hillary
Anna Navarro as Gloria

Reception
Michael Musto of The Village Voice stated that the film completes "a sort of Godfather trilogy of teen prostitution" and that he loves the film despite its poor quality.

Sequel
A fourth film in the series, Angel 4: Undercover, was released in 1993.

References

External links
 

Angel (film series)
1988 films
1980s action thriller films
1988 LGBT-related films
American LGBT-related films
American action thriller films
Films directed by Tom DeSimone
1980s English-language films
New World Pictures films
1980s American films